Acacia balsamea, commonly known as balsam wattle, is a shrub of the genus Acacia and the subgenus Plurinerves. 

It had erect yellowish branchlets. There are one to two simple inflorescences per axil. Each subglobular to obloid flower-head contains around 21 flowers.

The species was first formally described by the botanists Richard Sumner Cowan and Bruce Maslin in the work Miscellaneous new taxa and lectotypifications in Western Australian Acacia, mostly section Plurinerves (Leguminosae: Mimosoideae) as published in the journal Nuytsia. The ospecies was reclassified by Leslie Pedley in 2003 as Racosperma balsameum before reverting to the current genus in 2006.

It is native to an area in the Goldfields and Pilbara regions of Western Australia. The species has a scattered distribution from around Marble Bar east to Leinster to the Gibson Desert. It grows in rocky granite soils among stony hills amongst tall open shrubland communities and is often associated with Acacia aneura.

See also
 List of Acacia species

References

balsamea
Acacias of Western Australia
Plants described in 1999
Taxa named by Bruce Maslin